Greatest Hits is the second compilation album by American country music artist Steve Wariner.  It was released on September 7, 1987 via MCA Records.

Track listing

Chart performance

References

1987 compilation albums
Steve Wariner albums
Albums produced by Jimmy Bowen
Albums produced by Tony Brown (record producer)
Albums produced by Emory Gordy Jr.
MCA Records compilation albums